Brayden Stepien (born 27 July 1997) is an Australian cricketer. Stepien was called into the Melbourne Renegades squad in 2020 as a local replacement player for Sam Harper, where he made his Twenty20 debut on 25 January 2020, for the Melbourne Renegades in the 2019–20 Big Bash League season. On 14 January 2021, Stepien was recalled to the Renegades squad as a local replacement player for Cameron Boyce.

References

External links
 

1997 births
Living people
Australian cricketers
Melbourne Renegades cricketers